Mark Siebeck (born October 14, 1975 in Schkeuditz, Saxony) is a volleyball player from Germany, who played for the Men's National Team in the 2000s. He played as a wing-spiker.

Honours
2001 FIVB World League — 13th place
2001 European Championship — 9th place
2002 FIVB World League — 9th place
2003 FIVB World League — 10th place
2003 European Championship — 7th place

References
 FIVB biography

1975 births
Living people
German men's volleyball players
Volleyball players at the 2008 Summer Olympics
Olympic volleyball players of Germany
Expatriate volleyball players in Poland
People from Schkeuditz
Sportspeople from Saxony